Josef Schejbal (19 June 1898 – 1956) was a Czechoslovakian modern pentathlete. He competed at the 1928 Summer Olympics.

References

External links

1898 births
1956 deaths
Czechoslovak male modern pentathletes
Olympic modern pentathletes of Czechoslovakia
Modern pentathletes at the 1928 Summer Olympics